Hārītī (Sanskrit), also known as , , is both a revered goddess and demon, depending on the Buddhist tradition. She is one of the Twenty-Four Protective Deities of Mahayana Buddhism. 

In her positive aspects, she is regarded for the protection of children, easy delivery and happy child rearing, while her negative aspects include the belief of her terror towards irresponsible parents and unruly children.

In both Chinese and Japanese Buddhism, she is venerated as a protector deity, but in many folk traditions is often recognized as a female demon of misery and unhappiness towards children and parents.

Iconography

The iconography of Hārītī shows similarities to the Greek goddess Tyche and may have been transmitted to east Asia through the influence of Greco-Buddhism. In Greek art, Tyche was depicted in the presence of children, carrying a cornucopia (horn of plenty), an emblematic gubernaculum (ship's rudder), and the wheel of fortune; she may stand on the wheel, presiding over the entire circle of fate.

In Chinese Buddhism, Hārītī is also known as Hēlìdì (訶利帝) or Hēlìdìmǔ (訶梨帝母). In Chinese tradition, she is one of the Twenty-Four Protective Devas (二十四諸天 Èrshísì zhūtiān), a group of Dharmapalas who are venerated as protectors of Buddhists and the Dharma. Statues of this group (and Hārītī) are often enshrined within the Mahavira Hall in Chinese temples and monasteries.
Hārītī is a figure of the 26th chapter of the Lotus Sutra, and is especially important to Nichiren Buddhism.

Narrative

According to a Thervada oral story popular in southeast asia, Abhiriti or Hariti was a yakka woman who lived in Rajgir. She is considered as the possesser of mysterious wealth of the earth. She was steadfast in ethics, mindfulness, and wisdom. Her husband was the king of yakkas, the kubera. She had no children. In search of experience of motherhood, she started bringing human babies in her abode from Rajgir where the Buddha Shakyamuni was staying. Consequently, victim mothers from Rajgir pleaded to the Buddha. Buddha went to the abode of Hariti and brought one of her kidnapped beloved children with him in his vihara. Hariti was devastated when she found out. After futilely searching for that little, she finally appealed to the Buddha. The Buddha revealed how she was suffering in the absence of one child, similarly, many of other mothers and families were still suffering from the loss of their beloved children. Hariti acknowledged that their suffering is bigger than her. She returned all the kidnapped babies to their mothers and again became steadfast in the Dhamma. Buddha taught her Dhamma rituals associated with upbringing of a child. Hariti started practicing universal friendship and compassion to all beings. Hariti declared that she is no longer a woman with no children, she is now the mother of all beings. Hariti promised the Buddha that she would protect and love children of all realms. She practices and teaches the four Brahma viharas to all worldly beings, for benefits of her children. Buddha hailed her as the Jagatmata or the mother of all realms. In Thervada, she is the supreme mother of all humans as well as non humans who hari(eliminates or destroys)(-ti) obstacles from their life. 

According to another Mahayana myth, Hārītī was originally a rākṣasī of Rajgir at the same time that Gautama Buddha also lived there. She had hundreds of children of her own, whom she loved and doted upon, but to feed them, she abducted and killed the children of others. The bereaved mothers of her victims pleaded to the Buddha to save them. So, the Buddha stole the youngest of her sons, Piṅgala (in a variant version, the youngest daughter), and hid him under his rice bowl. After having desperately searched for her missing son throughout the universe, Hārītī finally appealed to the Buddha for help. 

The Buddha pointed out that she was suffering because she lost one of hundreds of children, and asked if she could imagine the suffering of parents whose only child had been devoured. She replied contritely that their suffering must be many times greater than hers. She then vowed to protect all children, and in lieu of children's flesh, she would henceforth only eat pomegranates. Henceforth Hārītī became the protector of children and women in childbirth. In exchange, the Buddha gave her bodhi, which enabled her to withstand black magic and evil powers, and gave her the facility to cure the sick.

In some variants of the myth, the Ten Rākṣasī Women are themselves daughters (or daughters' daughters) of Kishimojin. When Kishimojin accepted the Buddha's teachings, the Ten Demon Daughters did likewise.

References

Bibliography
 Langenberg,  Amy Paris (2013). Pregnant Words: South Asian Buddhist Tales of Fertility and Child protection, History of Religions 52 (4), 340-369 
 Lesbre, E. (2000). La conversion de Hārītī au Buddha: origine du thème iconographique et interprétations picturales chinoises, Arts asiatiques 55 (1), 98-119

External links

Buddhism and children
Buddhist goddesses
Childhood goddesses
Chinese goddesses
Japanese goddesses
Rakshasa
Tutelary goddesses
Twenty-Four Protective Deities
Yakshas